The 2017 Emporia State Hornets football team represented Emporia State University in the 2017 NCAA Division II football season. The Hornets played their home games on Jones Field at Francis G. Welch Stadium in Emporia, Kansas, as they have done since 1937. 2017 was the 120th season in school history. The Hornets were led by head coach Garin Higgins, who finished his 16th season overall, and 10th season at Emporia State. Emporia State has been a member of the Mid-America Intercollegiate Athletics Association (MIAA) since 1991.

Preseason
The Hornets enter the 2017 season after finishing with an 11–2 overall, 10–1 in conference play last season under Higgins. On August 1, 2017 at the MIAA Football Media Day, the Hornets were chosen to finish second in both the Coaches Poll and Media Polls.

On June 1, 2017, the Hornets were ranked No. 4 in Street & Smith's National Preseason Ranking Poll, and landed in the same spot by Lindy's Sports on June 23, 2017.

On August 14, the American Football Coaches Association released its poll, with the Hornets ranked No. 4 in the nation, the highest in school history.

Personnel

Coaching staff
Along with Higgins, there are 10 assistants.

Roster

Schedule

Source:

Game notes, regular season

Northwest Missouri

Nebraska–Kearney

Missouri Southern

Central Missouri

Central Oklahoma

Northeastern State

Lindenwood

Pittsburg State

Fort Hays State

Missouri Western

Washburn

References

Emporia State
Emporia State Hornets football seasons
Emporia State Hornets football